Bruce Fine (July 7, 1937 – December 28, 2011) served as a vice president and part-owner of the Cleveland Indians baseball team in the 1970s. He also served as treasurer and director of Midwest Bank in Cleveland.

He was born in Cleveland, Ohio and died in Carefree, Arizona.

References

1937 births
2011 deaths
Cleveland Indians owners
Businesspeople from Cleveland
People from Carefree, Arizona
20th-century American businesspeople